Germán Andrés Conti (born 3 June 1994) is an Argentine professional footballer who plays as a centre back for Russian club Lokomotiv Moscow.

Career
Born in Santa Fe, Conti began his career in the youth system of local club Colón. Following his progression, he debuted for the senior team in a league match against Club Olimpo on 8 December 2013, aged 19. After starting playing as a first choice on 15 July 2015, he became captain of Colón. With them, he amassed totals of 119 matches and 9 goals before signing a five-year contract with Portuguese club S.L. Benfica on 25 May 2018.

On 30 December 2019, Conti moved to Liga MX club Atlas, on a loan deal until December 2020.

On 12 March 2021, Conti moved on loan to Brazilian side Bahia.

On 6 January 2022, Conti moved on loan to América Mineiro.

On 30 January 2023, Conti signed a two-and-a-half year contract with Russian Premier League club FC Lokomotiv Moscow.

Honours
Benfica
Primeira Liga: 2018–19

Bahia
Copa do Nordeste: 2021

References

External links
 Germán Conti profile at ArgentineSoccer.com
 
 

1994 births
Footballers from Santa Fe, Argentina
Living people
Argentine footballers
Association football defenders
Club Atlético Colón footballers
S.L. Benfica footballers
S.L. Benfica B players
Atlas F.C. footballers
Esporte Clube Bahia players
América Futebol Clube (MG) players
FC Lokomotiv Moscow players
Argentine Primera División players
Primera Nacional players
Primeira Liga players
Liga Portugal 2 players
Liga MX players
Campeonato Brasileiro Série A players
Russian Premier League players
Argentine expatriate footballers
Expatriate footballers in Portugal
Expatriate footballers in Mexico
Expatriate footballers in Brazil
Expatriate footballers in Russia
Argentine expatriate sportspeople in Portugal
Argentine expatriate sportspeople in Mexico
Argentine expatriate sportspeople in Brazil
Argentine expatriate sportspeople in Russia